Seoul 1945 is a 2006 South Korean period television series starring Ryu Soo-young, Han Eun-jung, So Yoo-jin, Kim Ho-jin, and Park Sang-myun. It aired on KBS1 from January 1 to September 26, 2006 on Saturdays and Sundays at 21:30 for 71 episodes.

Set around 1945 right after Korea's liberation from Japanese colonial rule when the nation was engulfed by ideological turmoil, the story revolves around the rivalry between Suk-kyoung (So), a renowned pianist and daughter of a rich pro-Japanese politician, and Hae-kyung (Han), a headstrong servant; both women love Woon-hyuk (Ryu), whose ambition to become a lawyer gets thwarted due to his political ideology.

Plot
The series takes place during turbulent times in Korea, spanning from the end of the Japanese occupation to the eventual split of the country into North and South. The story revolves around the lives of four young adults who grew up together. Choi Woon-hyuk (Ryu Soo-young) is a child prodigy born into a family of poor miners; Kim Hae-kyung (Han Eun-jung) is the eldest daughter of tenant farmers; Lee Dong-woo (Kim Ho-jin) is the heir to a wealthy, well-connected family; and Moon Suk-kyung (So Yoo-jin) is the only child of an affluent and powerful political ally of Japan. In a blend of personal choices and circumstances beyond their control, each individual embarks on different paths that reflect the chaotic nature of the time as well as their true character. As their paths collide, love, friendship, loyalty, vengeance, moral conscience, and ideology become driving forces to irrevocably change the course of their lives.

Cast

Main characters
Ryu Soo-young as Choi Woon-hyuk
Kim Seok as young Woon-hyuk
Han Eun-jung as Kim Ke-hee / Kim Hae-kyung
Ko Joo-yeon as young Kim Ke-hee / Hikaru
So Yoo-jin as Moon Suk-kyung / Yukei
Park Eun-bin as young Suk-kyung
Kim Ho-jin as Lee Dong-woo
Kim Soo-min as young Dong-woo
Park Sang-myun as Park Chang-joo
Ko Kyu-pil as young Chang-joo

Supporting characters

Jang Hang-sun as Kim Pan-chul, Ke-hee's father
Go Doo-shim as Jung Hyang-geum, Ke-hee's mother
Jo An as Kim Ma-ri / Kim Yeon-kyung, Ke-hee's sister
Jung Han-yong as Choi Eun-kwan, Woon-hyuk's father
Lee Deok-hee as Jo Soon-yi, Woon-hyuk's mother
Park Shin-hye as Choi Geum-hee, Woon-hyuk's older sister
Yoon Hye-kyung as Choi Eun-hee, Woon-hyuk's younger sister
Jin Ji-hee as young Eun-hee
Kim Yeong-cheol as Baron Moon Jung-kwan, Suk-kyung's father
Lee Bo-hee as Ame Kaori, Baron Moon's mistress
Hong Yo-seob as Moon Dong-ki, Suk-kyung's uncle
Kim Kyung-sook as Yoon Jung-ja
Choi Jong-won as Lee In-pyung, Dong-woo's father
Kim Se-ah as Jo Young-eun, Dong-woo's governess
Jo Soo-min as Mal-hee
Son Jong-beom as Park Sung-joo
Lee Byung-wook as Oh Chul-hyung
Lee Gun as Kim Ki-soo
Han Min as Choi Song-hee
Kwon Sung-deok as Syngman Rhee
Yoon Seung-won as Jung Bong-doo
Lee Mi-young as Ji Kye-ok
Shin Hyun-tak as Jung Dol-yi
Kim Dong-hyun as Chang Taek-sang
Kim Hyo-won as Park Heon-young
Shin Goo as Lyuh Woon-hyung
Park Chul-ho as chairman
Song Yong-tae as vice chairman
Park Yong-jin as North Korean officer
Hyun Won as North Korean officer
Jang Dong-jik as South Korean soldier
Kim Ji-young

Awards and nominations

Controversy
At a press conference held in June 2006, 254 right-wing conservative groups accused the state-run KBS network of distorting history. They complained that Seoul 1945 had a left-wing bias, with its portrayal of Syngman Rhee as "a Japanese collaborator whose lust for power leads him to abandon a unified Korea, while characters of the Left are usually portrayed as considerate and concerned for the future of the nation," and that the drama accuses Rhee and others of involvement in the assassination of the center-left leader Lyuh Woon-hyung. They asked for a halt to the broadcast and threatened a campaign to boycott the television subscription fee.

In July 2006, Rhee In-soo, adopted son of South Korea's first president Syngman Rhee, and Jang Byung-hye, daughter of former prime minister Jang Taek-sang, filed a lawsuit against the producers of Seoul 1945, claiming that the drama distorts history and belittles the achievements of their late fathers.

In May 2007, Seoul Central District Court dismissed the lawsuit, stating that since the drama is based on fiction rather than historical facts, KBS is not responsible for defamation of character. In its ruling, the court said, "Such a description is part of artistic expression, which should be respected in producing soap opera that is based on fiction rather than facts." The court also said since there are historical documents that support the idea that former President Rhee was pro-Japanese and pro-American, the drama did not seriously distort facts.

References

External links
Seoul 1945 official KBS website 

Korean-language television shows
Korean Broadcasting System television dramas
2006 South Korean television series debuts
2006 South Korean television series endings
South Korean historical television series
South Korean action television series
Television series set in Korea under Japanese rule